Warner Herbert Jorgenson (26 March 1918 – 30 July 2005) was a Canadian politician in Manitoba. He served as a Progressive Conservative member of the House of Commons of Canada from 1957 to 1968, and as a Progressive Conservative member of the Manitoba Legislature from 1969 to 1981. From 1977 to 1981, he was a cabinet minister in the provincial government of Sterling Lyon.

Early life
Born in Canora, Saskatchewan, the son of George Jorgenson and Hilma Naslund, Jorgenson attended school at Ste-Elizabeth, Manitoba and Dominion City, Manitoba before becoming a farmer at Ste-Elizabeth.

Jorgenson served overseas with the Canadian Army from 1940 to 1946, and worked as a farmer on returning to Canada. He also served as President of the Riverview Golf and Country Club, and was an Honorary President of the Valley Agricultural Society.

Federal politics
He was first elected to the House of Commons in the general election of 1957, defeating longtime Liberal MP Rene Jutras by 250 votes in the southeastern Manitoba riding of Provencher. In the election of 1958, he was re-elected by a greater margin over Liberal Rene Prefontaine. He was not called to join John Diefenbaker's cabinet, but became parliamentary secretary to the Minister of Agriculture in 1960.

Jorgenson was re-elected in the election of 1962 and the election of 1963, defeating Liberal Stan Roberts on both occasions. In the 1965 election, he defeated Liberal Gordon Barkman by about 1,000 votes. He was defeated in the 1968 election by Mark Smerchanski, a leading organizer in the provincial Liberal party.

Provincial politics
Jorgenson then shifted to provincial politics, and was easily elected for the rural riding of Morris in the 1969 by-election. He did not serve in the cabinet of Walter Weir. He was easily re-elected in the provincial election of 1969, despite the Tories losing power to the NDP.

Jorgenson was again re-elected without difficulty in the election of 1973 and the election of 1977. The Tories regained power under Sterling Lyon on the latter occasion, and Jorgenson was called into cabinet on 24 October 1977 as government House Leader and Minister without Portfolio. On 20 October 1978, he was promoted to Minister of Consumer and Corporate Affairs with responsibility for the Rent Stabilization Board and the Office of Superintendent for Insurance. Following a cabinet shuffle on 16 January 1981, he was named Minister of Government Services with responsibility for the Manitoba Public Insurance Corporation. He was known in the legislature as an aggressive debater.

He was not a candidate in the 1981 election, and did not seek public office again.

During his final years, Warner Jorgenson had Alzheimer's disease. He died at Winnipeg's Deer Lodge Centre on 30 July 2005 at the age of 87.

Electoral record

References

External links
 

1918 births
2005 deaths
Canadian people of Norwegian descent
Farmers from Manitoba
Farmers from Saskatchewan
Progressive Conservative Party of Manitoba MLAs
Members of the House of Commons of Canada from Manitoba
People from Eastman Region, Manitoba
Progressive Conservative Party of Canada MPs
Neurological disease deaths in Manitoba
Deaths from Alzheimer's disease
Canadian military personnel of World War II
Members of the Executive Council of Manitoba
People from Canora, Saskatchewan